In early-May 2007, a significant tornado outbreak affected the Central United States. Over a three-day period from May 4–6, a total of 132 tornadoes touched down across seven states. Collectively, the tornadoes killed 14 people, injured 90, and left behind $264.7 million in damage. The most destructive events took place on May 4 when an intense supercell thunderstorm produced a family of 22 tornadoes in central Kansas, one of which inflicted EF5 damage across the small town of Greensburg (pop: ~1,500). Approximately 95 percent of the town was damaged or destroyed and 11 people died. The scale of destruction led to the near-complete reconstruction of the town, with it ultimately becoming one of the sustainable cities in the country. The event was precipitated by a nearly stationary upper-level trough along the Utah–Nebraska border with three surface boundaries extending across Kansas, Nebraska, Oklahoma, and Texas. A dry line became established over Kansas, Texas, and the Oklahoma Panhandle late on May 4 and became the focal point for extensive severe thunderstorm development. Conditions the following day remained exceptionally favorable for discrete supercell thunderstorm activity with ample instability and strong wind shear favoring long-lived tornadic storms alongside the potential for large hail. The likelihood of widespread severe weather prompted the issuance of a high-risk convective outlook from the Storm Prediction Center. Activity was expansive and prolific as forecast, with 92 tornadoes touching down across the country on May 5. Twenty-five tornadoes touched down across South Dakota on May 5, including one EF3 tornado and five EF2 tornadoes. Activity subsided on May 6, with only brief, weak tornadoes over rural areas in the Plains region. This resulted from more resiliant caps inhibiting thunderstorm development alongside the upper-level trough shifting east and weakening.

Confirmed tornadoes

Notes

References

F5 tornadoes
Tornadoes of 2007
May 2007 events in the United States
Tornadoes in the United States
2007 natural disasters in the United States